"Panorama" is a 1980 song by the Cars from their third studio album, Panorama. It was written by Ric Ocasek. Despite not being released as a single, the song has since become "a cult favorite".

Lyrics and music
"Panorama" is described by AllMusic writer Donald Guarisco as "one of Ric Ocasek's most direct love songs", with Ocasek singing "I just want to be in your panorama". Guarisco continued, saying that the music, however, "utilizes a quirky, up-tempo style, juxtaposing tense verses that veer high and low in a neurotic style with a more melodic chorus that dreamily descends from high to low in an alluring style."

Music video
Although "Panorama" did not see release as a single, a music video was filmed for the song. The video, described as "a fun spy film parody video" by Guarisco, was directed by Chuck Statler, notable for directing the band Devo's early music videos, along with Devo co-founder Gerald Casale. The song "got some early MTV exposure". The video featured all five members of the band, as well as producer Roy Thomas Baker.

PopMatters critic Dennis Shin rated the video as one of "20 ’80S music videos that have aged terribly."

Reception
AllMusic critic Greg Prato, reviewing the album, said, "standouts included the swirling title track that opens the album". Guarisco said that the track was "an entertainingly unconventional love song that fuses heartfelt sentiment with futuristic soundscapes."

References

The Cars songs
Songs written by Ric Ocasek
Song recordings produced by Roy Thomas Baker
1980 songs